This article presents the discography of American country music singer, Jimmy Dean.

Albums

1950s–1960s

1970s–1980s

1990s–2000s

Singles

1950s singles

1960s singles

1970s singles

1980s singles

Other singles

Singles with Dottie West

Featured singles

References

Country music discographies
Discographies of American artists